Kumauni cuisine is the food of the Kumaon region of Uttarakhand, India. 
Kumaoni food is simple and nutritious, suited to the harsh environment of the Himalayas. Pulses like gouhat (or kulath, a local type of bean) are fashioned into different preparations like, Kumaoni raitaa, Bal Mithai, ras bhaat, chain, faanda and thatwaani. All are unique preparations from the same pulse. Jholi or curry seasoned with curd. Chudkani and Joula made from bhatt pulses. Cereals like madua with rice and wheat are popular.  

Meat is also prepared but the recipe is quite similar to the way it is prepared in most of North India.
Several snack items, breads, dairy products and beverages form the heart of the Kumaoni cuisine which is traditionally eaten in several parts in Uttarakhand.

See also

 Singori
 Bal Mithai

References 

Indian cuisine by region
Cuisine
Culture of Uttarakhand
North Indian cuisine